The 2021 Canadian Championship Final was an association football match played between CF Montréal and Toronto FC at Saputo Stadium on November 21, 2021. The match determined the winner of the 2021 Canadian Championship, Canada's primary men's domestic cup competition. It was the 14th final in the competition's history, although it was played before the 2020 final, which was delayed over a year due to the COVID-19 pandemic. As a result, Montreal were technically the title holders as they had won the last played final in 2019.

Montreal won their fifth title following a 1–0 victory, qualifying them for the 2022 CONCACAF Champions League.

Teams

Venue

Background
This was the fourth time CF Montréal and Toronto FC faced one another in the Canadian Championship final. The first time, in 2014, Montréal won 2–1 over two legs to win the Voyageurs Cup and advance to the 2014–15 CONCACAF Champions League. Montreal subsequently made it to the Champions League final, where they were ultimately defeated by Mexican club América.

The most recent meeting occurred in the last played final in 2019, where the teams finished tied 1–1 on aggregate and Montréal went on to win a penalty shoot-out 3–1.

CF Montréal

CF Montréal received a bye to the quarter-finals of the competition, where they were drawn against Canadian Premier League side HFX Wanderers. The match was hosted by Halifax at the Wanderers Grounds. The Wanderers opened the scoring against the run of play in the 27th minute with a goal from Cory Bent. Matko Miljevic replied for Montréal in the 35th minute to make it 1–1 at half-time. The second half was completely dominated by Montréal as the Wanderers failed to register a shot attempt, while Montréal had 15. Nonetheless, Halifax managed to hold the 1–1 scoreline until near the end of the half, when substitute Ballou Tabla scored in the 89th minute and added a second three minutes later to secure a 3–1 win for CF Montréal.

In the semi-final, Montréal were drawn against two-time defending Canadian Premier League champions Forge FC, who hosted the match at Tim Hortons Field. In a close game, Forge succeeded in causing problems for Montréal with a high press, but both sides failed to capitalize on their scoring chances. Scoreless after 90 minutes, the match went directly to penalties. A lengthy penalty shoot-out saw all eleven players from both sides shoot once, with the match being decided after Forge goalkeeper Triston Henry missed his attempt and Montréal goalkeeper Sebastian Breza proceeded to score the winner.

Toronto FC

Toronto FC received a bye to the quarter-finals, where they were drawn against neighbouring Canadian Premier League side York United, who had dispatched League1 Ontario side Master's Futbol 5–0 in the opening round. The match was hosted by Toronto at BMO Field. TFC dominated the match, scoring two goals in the first half from Jonathan Osorio and Ifunanyachi Achara, and two in the second half from Yeferson Soteldo and Noble Okello to round out a 4–0 win.

In the semi-final, Toronto met Canadian Premier League leaders Pacific FC, who had eliminated fellow Major League Soccer side Vancouver Whitecaps FC in the preliminary round, only the second time an MLS club had been eliminated by a non-MLS club in the competition's history. This match was also played at BMO Field, and Toronto leapt out to a two-goal lead in the first 26 minutes thanks to goals from Jozy Altidore and Jacob Shaffelburg. Toronto failed to capitalize on subsequent opportunities however, and an 83rd-minute goal from Alejandro Díaz brought Pacific to within one, but TFC managed to hold on for a 2–1 win.

Match details

References

2021 in Canadian soccer
CF Montréal matches
Toronto FC matches
Sports competitions in Montreal
November 2021 sports events in Canada
2019 in Quebec
2020s in Montreal